Alfred Ashley-Brown (6 November 1907 – 5 March 1993) was an Australian politician. Born in Sydney, he was a company director, and served in the military 1942–45, achieving the rank of Major. A member of Blacktown City Council, he was the mayor from 1961 to 1965, and 1968 to 1971.

In 1972, he was elected to the Australian House of Representatives as the Labor member for Mitchell, defeating Liberal MP Les Irwin. He was defeated by Liberal Alan Cadman in 1974. Ashley-Brown died in 1993.

References

Australian Labor Party members of the Parliament of Australia
Members of the Australian House of Representatives for Mitchell
Members of the Australian House of Representatives
1907 births
1993 deaths
20th-century Australian politicians
Shire Presidents and Mayors of Blacktown